

Causes
Housing in China is highly regulated by the Hukou system. This gives rise to a large number of migrant workers, numbering at 290.77 million in 2019. These migrant workers have rural Hukou, but they move to the cities in order to find better jobs, though due to their rural Hukou they are entitled to fewer privileges than those with urban Hukou. According to Huili et al., these migrant workers "live in overcrowded and unsanitary conditions" and are always at risk of displacement to make way for new real estate developments. In 2017, the government responded to a deadly fire in a crowded building in Beijing by cracking down on dense illegal shared accommodations and evicting the residents, leaving many migrant laborers homeless. This comes in the context of larger attempts by the government to limit the population increase in Beijing, often targeting migrant laborers.

Several natural disasters have led to homelessness in China. The 2000 Yunnan earthquake left 92,479 homeless and destroyed over 41,000 homes.

Homelessness among people with mental health problems is 'much less common' in China than in high-income countries, due to stronger family ties, but is increasing due to migration within families and as a result of the one-child policy. A study in Xiangtan found at least 2439 schizophrenic people that have been homeless on a total population of 2.8 million. It was found that "homelessness was more common in individuals from rural communities (where social support services are limited), among those who wander away from their communities (i.e., those not from Xiangtan municipality), and among those with limited education (who are less able to mobilize social supports). Homelessness was also associated with greater age; [the cause] may be that older patients have ‘burned their bridges’ with relatives and, thus, end up on the streets."

During the Cultural Revolution a large part of child welfare homes were closed down, leaving their inhabitants homeless. By the late 1990s, many new homes were set up to accommodate abandoned children. In 1999, the Ministry of Civil Affairs estimated the number of abandoned children in welfare homes to be 66,000.

Efforts to assist the homeless
According to the Ministry of Civil Affairs, China  had approximately 2,000 shelters and 20,000 social workers to aid approximately 3 million homeless people in 2014.

From 2017 to 2019, the government of Guangdong Province assisted 5,388 homeless people in reuniting with relatives elsewhere in China. The Guangdong government assisted more than 150,000 people over a three-year period.

In 2020, in the wake of the COVID-19 pandemic, the Chinese Ministry of Civil Affairs announced several actions of the Central Committee in response to homelessness, including increasing support services and reuniting homeless people with their families. In Wuhan, the situation for homeless people was particularly bad, as the lockdown made it impossible for homeless migrants to return to other parts of the country. The Wuhan Civil Affairs Bureau set up 69 shelters in the city to house 4,843 people.

References

External links

China
Poverty in China